Toyoma Education Museum exhibits the history of education in Japan since the Meiji period. The U-shaped two-storey building around a courtyard, lined with balconies and with half-hexagons at the end of each wing, was designed by Kisaburo Yamazoe. It is representative of the western-inspired architecture of the Meiji period and in 1981 was designated an Important Cultural Property.

See also
Education in the Empire of Japan
Imperial Rescript on Education
Kaichi School Museum
Meiji Mura

References

External links
 Toyoma Education Museum homepage

Museums in Miyagi Prefecture
Buildings of the Meiji period
Schools in Japan
Education museums
Important Cultural Properties of Japan
Giyōfū architecture